James Iovine (born March 11, 1953) is an American entrepreneur, record executive, and media proprietor best known as the co-founder of Interscope Records. In 2006, Iovine and rapper-producer Dr. Dre founded Beats Electronics, which produces audio products and operated a now-defunct music streaming service. The company was purchased by Apple Inc. for $3 billion in May 2014.

Prior to the Apple acquisition of Beats in 2014, Iovine became chairman of Interscope-Geffen-A&M, an umbrella unit merged by the then-newly-reincarnated Universal Music Group in 1999.

Early life and training
James Iovine was born in Brooklyn, New York, to an Italian working-class family. His mother was a secretary and his father, Vincent "Jimmy" Iovine, worked on the docks as a longshoreman. His father's death and his love for Christmas inspired Jimmy to record A Very Special Christmas in 1985. Iovine attended Catholic school in Brooklyn, graduating from the since-closed Bishop Ford Central Catholic High School and went on to attend New York's John Jay College of Criminal Justice. At 19, he dropped out of college. He was introduced to music production after he met a songwriter who got him a job cleaning a recording studio, and he soon began working as an engineer. Since the start of his career, Iovine has been involved in the production of more than 250 albums.

Career

Music and film engineering and production career
In the early 1970s, Iovine became a recording engineer, working with John Lennon and Bruce Springsteen, among others. By 1973, Iovine was on staff at the New York studio the Record Plant, where he worked on Springsteen's Born to Run and Meat Loaf's Bat Out of Hell albums. He came to prominence via his work on the 1978 Patti Smith album Easter, which included her Top 40 hit "Because the Night". He teamed with Tom Petty and the Heartbreakers on Damn the Torpedoes and U2 on Rattle and Hum. Iovine also produced Bella Donna (the first solo album for Stevie Nicks), Making Movies for Dire Straits, and Get Close for The Pretenders.

Iovine served as sound engineer for the Voyager Golden Records, a pair of phonograph records which were launched aboard the Voyager space probes in 1977.

Iovine was also responsible for supervising the music used in the 1984 romance film Sixteen Candles, Streets of Fire and the 1988 comedy film Scrooged.

In 1990, Iovine co-founded Interscope Records, which became Interscope Geffen A&M after a merger in 1999.
 
Iovine signed Tupac Shakur to a recording contract as one of the first hip-hop acts on the Interscope label in 1991.

Iovine was also responsible for providing distribution, initial funding and financial oversight for the highly successful Death Row Records hip-hop label in the 1990s. Death Row operated as a subsidiary of his company Interscope, and was largely responsible for Interscope's initial platinum selling chart successes throughout the 1990s, which later launched the company into greater success in the 2000s with platinum artists like Eminem and 50 Cent.

In 2002, Iovine co-produced the Academy Award-winning Eminem film 8 Mile, which opened at #1 at the box office and went on to gross more than $240 million worldwide. Additionally, Iovine executive produced the 2009 LeBron James documentary More than a Game and 50 Cent's Get Rich or Die Tryin'.

Business career
In 2008, Iovine teamed up with Dr. Dre to co-found Beats By Dr. Dre, a headphones brand. The company had captured 20 percent market share of the headphones industry by 2012.

In January 2013, Iovine announced the expansion of the Beats brand into the online digital music world with Daisy, a new service slated to launch in late 2013. Former Topspin Media executive Ian Rogers and Nine Inch Nails frontman Trent Reznor were said to be involved.

On May 28, 2014, Apple Inc. announced the acquisition of Beats Electronics. Iovine was hired to assume an undisclosed position at Apple where he helped in the creation of Apple Music.

Television career
In 2005, Iovine made a guest appearance as himself on "Don't Make Me Over", an episode of Seth MacFarlane's Family Guy.

From 2011 to 2013, Iovine was a mentor on Fox's American Idol. Iovine's protégés—Scotty McCreery, Phillip Phillips, Jessica Sanchez, and Candice Glover—release their music through Interscope. Iovine stopped working with the show in mid-2013.

In July 2017, HBO ran a four-part documentary about Jimmy Iovine's relationship with Dr. Dre and other musicians titled The Defiant Ones.

Philanthropy
In May 2013, Iovine and Dr. Dre donated $70 million to the University of Southern California to create the USC Jimmy Iovine and Andre Young Academy for Arts, Technology and the Business of Innovation. The first class of the Academy began in September 2014 with 31 students.

Honors and recognitions
In 2011, Iovine was honored by The Producers & Engineers Wing of the Grammy Awards. "This year we pay tribute to an industry leader, Jimmy Iovine, who has made an indelible impact as a recording engineer, producer, founder of Interscope Records, and now, entrepreneur focused on audio quality," Neil Portnow, president of the National Academy of Recording Arts and Sciences, the governing body of the Grammy Awards, said in presenting the award.

On May 17, 2013, Iovine received an honorary Doctor of Music degree from the University of Southern California and gave the 2013 USC commencement address.

In 2022, Iovine was inducted into the Rock and Roll Hall of Fame in the Ahmet Ertegun Award category.

Personal life
New York rock radio DJ Carol Miller and Iovine had a two-year relationship in the late 1970s.  Miller says "Jimmy had a wonderful, close-knit Italian Catholic family from Brooklyn and Staten Island who could not have been nicer to me.  It was I, the Jewish girl from Queens, who always felt silently out of place."  She says her father wasn't very nice to Iovine and was against the relationship due to the differences in their religions.  According to Miller, the relationship ended in 1980, when Iovine began spending most of his time in California working with singer Stevie Nicks.

While producing her album Bella Donna, Iovine entered into a relationship with Nicks. The two split in 1982. Nicks wrote the song "Straight Back", included in the Fleetwood Mac album Mirage, about him.  According to Nicks, Iovine was an inspiration for one of her signature songs, "Edge of Seventeen".  Nicks has said that Iovine's despondence from the death of his good friend John Lennon overwhelmed her, and eventually led to the end of their relationship.  However, the strong emotion of the time led to the creation of "Edge of Seventeen."

Iovine was married for 24 years to writer, lawyer, and model Vicki Iovine before divorcing; the couple have four children.

In 2014 he started dating Liberty Ross. They got married in front of their Malibu beach house on Valentine's Day 2016, with friends and family in attendance. Sean Combs remarked that the wedding was "the blackest wedding with a Rabbi [he had] ever seen!"

Selected discography

Discography

Filmography

References

External links

 Jimmy Iovine at All Music Guide

1953 births
American audio engineers
American businesspeople in retailing
American music industry executives
American people of Italian descent
Businesspeople from New York City
Engineers from New York City
Film producers from New York (state)
John Jay College of Criminal Justice alumni
Living people
Musicians from Brooklyn
Participants in American reality television series
People from Red Hook, Brooklyn
Record producers from New York (state)